Eremaea beaufortioides is a plant in the myrtle family, Myrtaceae and is endemic to the south-west of Western Australia. It is a spreading shrub with oval to egg-shaped leaves, and orange flowers in spring. Flowers appear in groups of one to six on the ends of long branches formed in the previous year.

Description
There is variation in leaf size and shape between the three varieties of the species.

The flowers are orange-coloured and arranged in groups of up to six on the ends of the branches of the previous year's growth. The stamens, which give the flower its colour, are arranged in 5 bundles, each containing 34 to 48 stamens. Flowering occurs from September to December and is followed by fruits which are woody capsules.

Taxonomy and naming
Eremaea beaufortioides was first formally described in 1867 by George Bentham in Flora Australiensis. The specific epithet (beaufortioides) is presumably a reference to the similarity of this species to a species of Beaufortia since εἶδος (eîdos) is an Ancient Greek word meaning “form" or "likeness”.

There are three varieties:
 Eremaea beaufortioides var. beaufortioides has thin leaves with 5 or more veins and flowers with a glabrous hypanthium;
 Eremaea beaufortioides var. lachnostanthe has thin leaves with 3 veins and flowers with a densely hairy hypanthium;
 Eremaea beaufortioides var. microphylla has small, thick leaves with fewer than 3 veins which may be hard to see.

Distribution and habitat
Eremaea beaufortioides is found in the Irwin district in the Avon Wheatbelt, Geraldton Sandplains, Swan Coastal Plain and Yalgoo biogeographic regions. It grows in sand over laterite.

Conservation
Eremaea beaufortioides is classified as "not threatened" by the Western Australian Government Department of Parks and Wildlife.

Use in horticulture
Eremaea beaufortioides is an attractive species but although it is the hardiest of its genus, is difficult to grow in more humid areas unless grafted. It needs a sunny position and excellent drainage.

References

beaufortioides
Myrtales of Australia
Plants described in 1867
Endemic flora of Western Australia